Christoffel Pierson (19 May 1631 – 11 August 1714) was a Dutch Golden Age painter.

Biography
According to Arnold Houbraken, Pierson was brought up to become a merchant. Schooled in Latin, French, and drawing, he spent time as a clerk (in a "comptoir"), but showed more talent for painting, which he learned from friend Bartholomeus Meyburgh, who was only 3 years older than he was.  In 1551-1552 he spent a year studying with Meyburgh, and then he moved to Schiedam, where he married his first wife in 1652. In 1653 he travelled with Meyburgh to Germany. On the way back they travelled through Bremervörde, where they met with the Swedish Army, and Pierson painted the portrait of Fieldmarshal Carl Gustaf Wrangel. The fieldmarshal was so satisfied that he offered both men the chance of becoming court painter to Queen Christina, but they turned it down, Meyburgh because he didn't want to, and Pierson because he had only just gotten married 6 months beforehand.

Upon his return to the Netherlands Pierson moved his household to Gouda, South Holland where, inspired by the success of Anthonie Leemans, he made a profitable living making similar trompe l'oeil paintings of hunting paraphernalia, birdcages, and weaponry. He was so successful at this that many were fooled into believing that these objects truly hung on the wall. In Gouda he also made drawings on parchment of the famous stained glass windows of the Janskerk (Gouda), including those by the brothers Dirk Crabeth and Wouter Crabeth I, for the Gouda city council. After the death of his first wife, he remarried a woman from Schiedam and moved back there in 1679, where he lived until 1691 before returning to Gouda, where he later died.

He was also a good poet, and wrote as many poems as he made paintings. The painter and printmaker Arnoud van Halen made a portrait of him for his cabinet of poets, that at the time Houbraken was writing, totalled more than 100 portraits.

His last play, Dagobert, was published in the year of his death, 1714.

Though he worked in several locations, most notably in Gouda and Schiedam, he is registered only in 1685 as a member of the Schiedam Guild of St. Luke.

References

External links

Christoffel Pierson on Artnet

1631 births
1714 deaths
Dutch Golden Age painters
Dutch male painters
Artists from The Hague
Painters from Schiedam